LEGO SERIOUS PLAY is a facilitation methodology developed at The Lego Group. Since 2010 it is available under an open source community-based model. Its goal is improving creative thinking and communication. People build with Lego bricks 3-dimensional models of their ideas and tell stories about their models. Hence the name "serious play".

Origins
Johan Roos and Bart Victor created the "Serious Play" concept and process in the mid-1990s as a way to enable managers to describe, create and challenge their views on their business. Dr. Roos is now Chief Academic Officer at Hult International Business School and Dr. Bart Victor is Cal Turner Professor of Moral Leadership at Vanderbilt University. They created Serious Play while they were both professors at IMD in Switzerland.

The conceptual foundation of Serious Play combines ideas from constructivism (Piaget 1951), constructionism (Harel and Papert 1991), complex adaptive system theory (Holland 1995) and autopoietic corporate epistemology (von Krogh and Roos 1994; 1995) applied to the context of management and organizations. It also relies on action research.

The empirical foundation of the concept of Serious Play stems from Roos and Victor's experiments with leadership teams in Tetra Pak, Hydro Aluminium and TFL and during an IMD program for the top 300 leaders in the Lego Group. They presented their early ideas in a short article published by IMD in 1998 entitled "In Search for Original Strategies: How About Some Serious Play?" and in the 1999 article "Towards a New Model of Strategy-making as Serious Play" published by European Management Journal. In 2004 the journal Long-Range Planning published their article "Playing Seriously with Strategy" (with Matt Statler), which serves as the foundation for LEGO Serious Play concept.

From experiment to open source product

The development of the LEGO Serious Play product line in LEGO Company involved several teams and more than 20 iterations. Work at LEGO Company began with the owner Mr. Kjeld Kirk Kristiansen. Initially he was hesitant but presented with the early findings he became convinced that Roos and Victor's ideas had business value and decided to encourage and sponsor a commercial application under the auspices of the LEGO Company. As the method developed in real-time sessions with various companies, results were robust and reproducible.

In 1999, LEGO Group submitted the application to protect Serious Play trademark. While the LEGO Serious Play methodology is currently open source, its trademark is still owned and protected by LEGO Group. The trademark applies to LEGO product line with dedicated Lego Serious Play kits.

Initially in 2001, the subsidiary of LEGO Company called Executive Discovery submitted the application to patent the methodology and the material product line. Later in 2006 Executive Discovery re-submitted the patent application. However, U.S. patent office never issued the official patent because by 2008 the application was abandoned by the applicant. Therefore, LEGO Serious Play methodology was never patent protected.

In 2010, the LEGO group made the methodology open source, releasing the LEGO Serious Play methodology under a Creative Commons community-based licence. The main LEGO Serious Play communities are: Association of Master Trainers, LSPConnect, Serious Play Pro, Global Federation of LSP Master Trainers.

In 2019, Playmobil released their competing material product Playmobil Pro that uses a similar set of plastic figurines and toys for story telling.

The research effort

In 2000, the systematic research effort on LEGO Serious Play methodology focusing on the idea of playing seriously in organizations first started at the Swiss-based think tank Imagination Lab Foundation. The Imagination Lab's main task was researching the use of the method for strategy development in organizations. Their team of researchers wrote 3 books, 74 working and research papers, and 12 short articles. Imagination Lab ceased to exist in 2004 and created European Academy of Management iLab Foundation Award.

Since 2004, David Gauntlett published a number of books on combination of LEGO Serious Play in media studies. This approach makes use of metaphor and invites participants to build metaphorical models of their identities. The process of making something, and then reflecting upon it, is claimed to give a more nuanced insight into participants' feelings or experiences.

Since 2007, Louise Møller Haase (née Louise Møller Nielsen) from Aalborg University published her dissertation, subsequent books and articles on personal- and shared experiential concepts and product development and prototyping approaches focusing on LEGO Serious Play research projects at TC Electronic, The Red Cross, Daimler AG, and Copenhagen Living Lab.

In 2009, the LEGO Serious Play method was further developed for use in schools. Teachers are trained to use it with students from six years old. The method has also been adapted for use in higher education as a tool for teaching and learning, research, and ideation (Nolan 2009). Subsequently, IJMAR has published a special issue on Lego Serious Play applications.

By 2011, Loizos Heracleous from Warwick Business School and Claus D. Jacobs from the University of St. Gallen finished their 2-year research project on embodied metaphors, which elaborated on LEGO Serious Play action research at BASF and UNICEF.

The webatelier.net Lab of the Università della Svizzera italiana (University of Lugano, Switzerland) has further developed the methodology, releasing in 2011 URL (User Requirements with LEGO) under the Creative Commons licence.

Since 2014, Alison James from the University of Winchester and her research team have researched the use of LEGO Serious Play in various tertiary educational institutions.

Research on LEGO Serious Play methodology continues at various academic institutions. See the expanding list of publications below.

Critique

LEGO Serious Play facilitators have vested business interests in promoting the use of the method. Therefore, most available case studies focus on success stories. No comparative studies using control groups have measured the effect and usefulness of LEGO Serious Play methodology in comparison with conventional workshops.

Some authors are critical of LEGO Serious Play methodology. Journalist Dan Lyons has suggested that LEGO Serious Play is merely toy therapy, which is useless, on par with New Age psychology. He suggests: "Lego workshops are just one example of the nonsense that is creeping into the workplace. ... The problem isn’t just that these exercises are pointless and silly. For a lot of people, this stuff can be really stressful. For older workers — say, people over 50 — these workshops compound the fear they already have about being pushed out of their jobs. But younger workers hate them too. “It feels like you’ve joined a cult,” says a thirtysomething software programmer whose department spent a day doing a LEGO workshop. “The purpose seems to be to indoctrinate people to follow orders.”"

Publications

 Beltrami G., 2017, LEGO SERIOUS PLAY: pensare con le mani, Franco Angeli
 Blair, S, 2020, 'Mastering the LEGO Serious Play Method: 44 Facilitation Techniques for Trained Lego Serious Play Facilitators.' ProMeet, London
 Blair, S, 2020, 'How to Facilitate the LEGO Serious Play Method Online.’ ProMeet, London
 Blair, S., Rillo M, 2016, 'Serious Work: How to Facilitate Lego Serious Play Meetings and Workshops.' ProMeet, London.
 Bürgi, P., and J. Roos, 2003, 'Images of Strategy,' European Management Journal, 2003, 21(1): 69–78.
 Bürgi, P., and Jacobs, C., and J. Roos, 2005, 'From Metaphor to Practice in the Crafting of Strategy,' Journal of Management Inquiry, 14(1): 78–94.
 Frick, E., S. Tardini, and L. Cantoni, 2014, 'LEGO SERIOUS PLAY applications to enhance creativity in participatory design'. In Fredricka K. Reisman (ed.), Creativity in Business. Research Papers on Knowledge, Innovation and Enterprise, Volume II, KIE Conference Book Series, pp. 200–210. Available at: . 
 Frick, E., S. Tardini, and L. Cantoni, 2013, 'White Paper on LEGO SERIOUS PLAY. A state of the art of its application in Europe.' Available at: S-PLAY - S-PLAY White Paper Published!.
 Gauntlett, D. 2005, 'Creative Explorations: New approaches to identities and audiences' London: Routledge.
 Grey. F., and J. Roos, 2005, 'Playing Seriously with Strategy,' Physics World, 18(2): 18–19.
 Harel, I. and Papert, S. 1991, eds. Constructionism, Ablex Publishing Corporation, Piaget, Norwood, NJ.
 Harn, P. L., Hsiao, C.C. （2018）. A Preliminary Study on LEGO®-Based Workplace Stress Reduction with Six Bricks and LEGO® SERIOUS PLAY® in Taiwan. World Journal of Research and Review, 6（1）,64-67.
 Harn, P. L.( 2017). A Preliminary Study of the Empowerment Effects of Strength-Based LEGO® SERIOUS PLAY® on Two Taiwanese Adult Survivors by Earlier Domestic Violence. Psychological Studies, 62(2):142–151.
 Heracleous, L. and Jacobs, C.D., 2012, Crafting Strategy: Embodied Metaphors in Practice. Cambridge University Press
 Holland, J., 1995, Hidden order: How adaptation builds complexity. Reading, MA: Addison-Wesley. 
 James, A. and Brookfield, J. D., 2014, Engaging Imagination: Helping Students Become Creative and Reflective Thinkers. Jossey-Bass.
 James, A. and Nerantzi, C., 2019, The Power of Play in Higher Education. Creativity in Tertiary Learning. Palgrave McMillan.
 Kristiansen, P., and R. Rasmussen, 2014, Building a better business using the LEGO SERIOUS PLAY method. Hoboken, NJ: Wiley.
 Lissack, M., and J. Roos, 1999, The Next Common Sense: Mastering Corporate Complexity through Coherence, Nicholas Brealey Publishing, London. Translated into Japanese (2001) and Estonian (2002).
 McCusker, S. (2014) 'Lego, seriously: Thinking through building.' Intl. J. Knowledge, Innovation and Entrepreneurship 2 (1), 27-37
 McCusker,S. Clifford-swan, J.(2018) 'The Use of Metaphors With LEGO® SERIOUS PLAY ® For Harmony and Innovation' International Journal of Management and Applied Research 5 (4), 174-192
 McCusker, S. (2019) 'Everybody's monkey is important: LEGO® Serious Play® as a methodology for enabling equality of voice within diverse groups' International Journal of Research & Method in Education, 1-17
 Nielsen, L. M., 2010, Personal- and shared experiential concepts. Aalborg University.
 Nolan, S., (2009). 'Physical Metaphorical Modelling with Lego as a Technology for Collaborative Personalised Learning'. In: O'Donoghue, J, (ed). Technology-supported Environments for Personalized Learning: Methods and Case Studies. (Premier Reference Source).
 Oliver, D., and J. Roos, 2007, 'Constructing Organizational Identity,' British Journal of Management, 18(4): 342–358.
 Oliver, D. and J. Roos, 2005, 'Decision Making in High Velocity Environments: The Importance of Guiding Principles,' Organization Studies, 26(6): 889–913.
 Oliver, D., and J. Roos, 2000, Striking a Balance: Complexity and Knowledge Landscapes, McGraw-Hill, Maidenhead.
 Piaget, J, 1951, The Child's Conception of the World, Routledge, London.
 Roos, J., 2006, Thinking From Within: A Hands-On Strategy Practice, Palgrave Macmillan, Basingstoke.
 Roos, J., and R. Said, 2005, 'Generating Managerial Commitment and Responsibility,' European Management Review, 2: 48 - 58.
 Roos, J, Victor, B., and M. Statler, 2004, 'Playing Seriously with Strategy,' Long-Range Planning, 37(6): 549–568.
 Roos, J., 2004, 'Sparking Strategic Imagination,' Sloan Management Review, 2004, 46(1): 96.
 Roos, J., and B. Victor, 1999, Towards a Model of Strategy Making as Serious Play,' European Management Journal, 17(4): 348–355.
 Roos, J., and D. Oliver, 1999, 'From Fitness Landscapes to Knowledge Landscapes', Systemic Practice and Action Research, 12(3): 279–293.
 Roos, J., and B. Victor, 'In Search Of Original Strategies: How About Some Serious Play?' IMD Perspectives for Managers, 1998, (26) 15.
 von Krogh, G., and J. Roos, 1995, Organizational Epistemology, Macmillan, Oxford.
 Roos, J., 'Transformative Management Education,' 2008, in Teaching and Learning at Business Schools: Transforming the Delivery of Business Education, Bild, M., Mårtensson, P. and K. Nilsson (eds.), Gower: 63–76.
 von Krogh, G., Roos, J., and K. Slocum, 1994, 'An Essay on Corporate Epistemology', Strategic Management Journal, Special Issue on 'Rethinking Strategy - The Search for New Strategy Paradigms', 15: 53–71.
 Statler, M., Roos, J., and B. Victor, 2009, 'Ain't Misbehavin': Taking Play Seriously in Organizations,' Journal of Change Management, 9(1): 87–107.
 Statler, J., Jacobs, J. and J. Roos, 2008, 'Performing Strategy: Analogical Reasoning as Strategic Practice', Scandinavian Journal of Management, 24: 133–144
 Wengel, Y., McIntosh, A. J., & Cockburn-Wootten, C., 2016, Constructing tourism realities through LEGO® SERIOUS PLAY®. Annals of Tourism Research, 56, 161–163. Constructing tourism realities through LEGO Serious Play

References

External links
 Official website

Human resource management
Serious Play